The Eastern Shore of Maryland is a part of the U.S. state of Maryland that lies mostly on the east side of the Chesapeake Bay.  Nine counties are normally included in the region. The Eastern Shore is part of the larger Delmarva Peninsula that Maryland shares with Delaware and Virginia.

As of the 2010 census, its population was 449,226, with just under 8% of Marylanders living in the region. The region is politically more conservative than the rest of the state, generally returning more votes for Republicans than Democrats in statewide and national elections.

Developed in the colonial and federal period for agriculture, the Eastern Shore has remained a relatively rural region. Salisbury is the most populous community on the Eastern Shore of Maryland. The region's economy is dominated by three industry sectors: fishing along the coasts, especially for shellfish such as the blue crab; farming, especially large-scale chicken farms; and tourism, especially centered on the Atlantic coast and beach resort of Ocean City. 
Because of its coastal and low-lying geography, the region is vulnerable to extreme weather events, including hurricanes and larger environmental issues like climate change and rising sea levels.  

The region has few major roads tying it together; the main connection to the other parts of Maryland is the Chesapeake Bay Bridge, which carries U.S. Route 50 and U.S. Route 301. U.S. Route 13 connects the southern part of the Eastern Shore to both Delaware and points north and Virginia and points south.

Geography

The Eastern Shore of Maryland includes nine counties on the eastern side of the Chesapeake Bay's or Susquehanna River, which is the western border of Cecil County's with Harford County, Maryland and borders the Mason–Dixon line with Delaware to the east and north, the Atlantic Ocean on the east, and Virginia's Eastern Shore on the south. Maryland's and Virginia's Eastern Shore and all of Delaware form the Delmarva Peninsula.

The counties comprised in the Eastern Shore are Caroline, Cecil, Dorchester, Kent, Queen Anne's, Somerset, Talbot, Wicomico, and Worcester counties. To the south, the Calvert-Scarborough Line separates Maryland from Virginia. While having different boundaries than in the 17th-18th century, the Eastern Shore's geographic definition was set once everyone agreed on where Watkins Point—on the western side of the peninsula—is and where the Bay's shoreline began (since the bay side peters out into marshes and wetlands).

In 1668, Philip [Calvert] obtained Virginia recognition of Maryland's claims to present-day Somerset County, surveying a dividing line between the two colonies with Surveyor General of Virginia, Edmund Scarborough. Meanwhile, he negotiated treaties with Lower Eastern Shore Indian tribes harassing English settlers. These treaties defined standards of conduct for Indian-English relations, establishing an overall peace in the region.

The northern limit is harder to locate. Some dispute Cecil County as a true Eastern Shore territory due to Interstate 95's presence in its surrounding developments and its proximity to and influence from nearby urban areas such as Philadelphia, Wilmington, and Baltimore. It straddles the Elk River, resulting in 50% of the county being west of the Shore.

Like New Castle County, Delaware, Cecil County is crossed by the Fall Line, a geologic division where the rockier highlands of the Piedmont region meet the Atlantic coastal plain, a flat, sandy area that forms the coast. The coastal plain includes the Delmarva Peninsula and hence the Eastern Shore of Maryland. The geology of Delmarva is an inseparable part of the Eastern Shore, which has few rocky outcrops south of Kent County.

The Chesapeake and Delaware Canal crosses from Back Creek on the Elk River to Port Penn, Delaware. While it was a shallow canal with locks after its construction in 1829, it was deepened in the early 20th century to sea level, and physically separates the Delmarva Peninsula from the rest of the United States. Maryland south of the canal is considered the Eastern Shore by residents. The term Western Shore is used by Eastern Shore residents to describe all the counties of Maryland west of the Chesapeake Bay, but especially those of the Baltimore-Washington metropolitan area and Southern Maryland.

The north–south section of the Mason–Dixon line forms the border between Maryland and Delaware. The border was originally marked every mile by a stone, and every five miles by a "crownstone". The line is not quite due north and south, but is as straight as survey methods of the 1760s could make it. It was surveyed as a compromise solution to a century-long wrangle over colonial territory between the Penn and Calvert families of England. If the Chesapeake Bay/Delaware Bay watershed divide had been taken as the borderline, the state of Delaware would be about half its current size.

History

Early history
William Claiborne was granted land (part of the Colony of Virginia) in 1629 and named the land "Kent County". In 1631, he sailed north up the Chesapeake Bay from its south and west side to the area known today as Kent Island. There he made a fortified settlement that is considered to be the first English settlement within the Province of Maryland. Talbot County was formed in 1662. Cecil County was formed in 1674, by proclamation of the Governor, from eastern portions of Baltimore County and the northern portion of Kent County. Wicomico County was formed in 1867, as the 9th and last county, created from Somerset and Worcester counties.

Formation of counties
1642 Kent County - In 1642, the governor and council appointed commissioners for the Isle and County of Kent. This act appears to have led to the establishment of Kent County, named after the county of Kent in England.
1661 Talbot County - named for Lady Grace Talbot, the wife of Sir Robert Talbot, an Irish statesman, and the sister of Cecilius Calvert, 2nd Baron Baltimore.
1666 Somerset County - named for Mary, Lady Somerset, the wife of Sir John Somerset and daughter of Thomas Arundell, 1st Baron Arundell of Wardour.
1669 Dorchester County - Named for the Earl of Dorset, a family friend of the Calverts (the founding family of the Maryland colony). Dorchester is the County Town of Dorset in England.
1674 Cecil County.
1706 Queen Anne's County - formed from northern parts of Talbot and southern portions of Kent. Name after Queen Anne of Great Britain who reigned when the county was established.
1742 Worcester County - named for the Earl of Worcester.
1773 Caroline County - formed from parts of Dorchester and Queen Anne's counties. The county derives its name from Lady Caroline Eden, wife of Maryland's last colonial governor of the Province of Maryland, Robert Eden.
1867 Wicomico County.

19th century

Ocean City was founded on July 4, 1875, when the Atlantic Hotel opened on Assateague Island. At the time, Assateague Island was continuous from the Delaware state line to well south of Ocean City: the Ocean City Inlet was not formed until a hurricane in August 1933 cut across the south end of the town. The inlet was cut not by waves sweeping inland, but by 4 or 5 days' worth of freshwater runoff from the coastal creeks running seaward. By 1935, government money had built jetties to make the inlet permanent, dividing Fenwick Island (north) from Assateague Island (south). Early transportation to the island was by train.

Until the 1820s, travel and commerce between the Eastern Shore and Baltimore were less important than the connections between it and Philadelphia. Water travel by sailboat and steamer linked the Eastern Shore to Baltimore more tightly beginning about 1813, when the first steamboat traveled the Bay. By the 1880s, railroad lines linked the Eastern Shore to Philadelphia and later, Norfolk, Virginia, by way of a railroad line straight south from Wilmington to Dover, Delmar, Salisbury, and Cape Charles. Maryland's Eastern Shore was served by branch lines running generally southwest from the main route. See List of railroad lines in the Delmarva Peninsula. The Eastern Shore's many branchlines were built after the Civil War by local companies; by the late nineteenth century, all were controlled by the Pennsylvania Railroad (which also bought control of the steamboat and ferry routes), then Conrail and Norfolk Southern. Today the remaining active railroad tracks on the Eastern Shore are operated by short-line railroads Delmarva Central Railroad and the Maryland and Delaware Railroad.

Commercial east–west ties between Delaware towns and Maryland towns were culturally significant in Colonial and Early American periods despite the border line, which largely cut through woods and swamps. Trade with Philadelphia was conducted by overland routes to Delaware towns such as Odessa (then called Cantwell's Bridge) and Smyrna, then called Duck Creek. Agricultural products and milled grain were taken up the Delaware River by "shallop men" in small vessels called shallops. These cultural connections continue to this day.

20th and 21st centuries
An east–west rail route ran from a ferry terminal at Claiborne, west of St. Michaels, to Ocean City, via the Baltimore and Eastern Shore Railroad and the Wicomico and Pocomoke Railroad. Travelers could also take a ferry to Love Point on Kent Island, board a Queen Anne's Railroad train, and travel east to Lewes and Rehoboth Beach, Delaware.

Automobile transportation across the Chesapeake Bay was by ferryboat until 1952, when the first Chesapeake Bay Bridge was opened for traffic.

In the late 1950s and early 1960s, developers began selling lots on Assateague Island, south of the inlet. However, a storm on March 6, 1962 destroyed houses, shacks, and roads. The state and federal governments intervened before reconstruction by creating the Assateague Island National Seashore and Assateague State Park to preserve this area rather than have it be developed.

An Eastern Shore Baseball League operated during three periods between 1922 and 1949. It was a Class D minor league with teams in all three states of Delmarva.

Demographics
Although the Eastern Shore comprises more than a third of Maryland's land area, it has a population of 420,792 as of 2004, representing about 8% of Maryland's population. The most populous city on the Eastern Shore is Salisbury, and the most populous county is Cecil. The Salisbury metropolitan area is the only metropolitan statistical area on the Eastern Shore; it comprises Somerset, Wicomico, and Worcester counties, and Sussex County, Delaware.

Elections
The Eastern Shore is considerably more conservative than the more densely populated and urban Western Shore. Since the late 20th century, when conservative whites shifted to the Republican Party, the region has strongly supported Republican candidates for governor. The last three Republican candidates for governor–Ellen Sauerbrey, Bob Ehrlich, and Larry Hogan–have swept all nine counties.

At the presidential level, the Eastern Shore also leans Republican. But Kent and Somerset counties have flipped back and forth in supporting Democratic and Republican presidential candidates. The last Democrat to win Dorchester County was Bill Clinton from Arkansas in 1996. Cecil County has not gone Democratic since Jimmy Carter from Georgia won the county in 1976. Queen Anne's, Caroline, Wicomico, and Worcester counties have voted Republican at every election subsequent to Lyndon Johnson's landslide. Up until 2020, this was true for Talbot County as well, but it was won by Joe Biden.

The Eastern Shore has long been a part of Maryland's 1st Congressional district. Democrat Roy Dyson represented the 1st district from 1981 until 1990, when he was defeated by Republican Wayne Gilchrest. Gilchrest held the seat until 2008, when State Senator Andy Harris defeated him in the Republican primary. Harris narrowly lost the subsequent general election to Democrat Frank Kratovil, Queen Anne's County state's attorney. In 2010, Harris again ran for the district and handily defeated Kratovil after a single term in office. Harris has held the seat without serious difficulty since.

In the Maryland General Assembly, the Eastern Shore encompasses a portion of district 35B and all of districts 35A, 36, 37A and 37B, 38A, 38B and 38C. All seats are held by Republicans except for a state delegate seat in district 37A.

Economy

Tourism

Ocean City's skyline, containing tall hotels and condominiums, stands out within Delmarva. At the southern end of the town, a recreational boardwalk spans over thirty blocks, containing carnival rides and games, restaurants, bars, arcades, and clothing boutiques.

Tourists visit St. Michaels on a neck surrounded by water; the colonial former port of Oxford; Chestertown; and isolated Smith Island in the Chesapeake Bay. North of Crisfield is Janes Island State Park, with camping and kayaking trails through marshlands.

Fishing

At the southern end of the Chesapeake coast of Maryland, the town of Crisfield is home to a fishing, crabbing, and seafood processing industry.

Agriculture

In the 21st century, the main economic activities on the Eastern Shore are vegetable and grain farming, seafood, large-scale chicken breeding (Perdue Farms was founded in Salisbury and is still headquartered there today), and tourism. Tobacco was the chief commodity crop during colonial times. The agricultural economy switched to mixed products, including grain, in the second half of the 18th century.

Energy 

Energy in the Eastern shore is provided by five oil and natural gas plants.

Pipeline

Environment

As part of the broader Chesapeake Bay watershed, the Eastern Shore confronts common environmental issues of the watershed, such as nutrient runoff from agriculture, but it is also vulnerable to climate change.

Because of its low-lying geography and sandy soil, the region is particularly vulnerable to sea level rise and salt water intrusion. Moreover, because of the coastal geography, infrastructure is already being damaged both due to sea level rise, and storm surge from tropical storms and hurricanes.

The Eastern Shore’s economy depends on the larger fisheries and farming, both of which are sensitive to climate change.

Transportation

Various waterways provide a medium for commerce and boaters: the Atlantic Ocean, Chesapeake Bay, the Susquehanna River, and the Chesapeake and Delaware Canal.

There are three major routes to the Eastern Shore:
The Chesapeake Bay Bridge spans  of the Chesapeake Bay, and at the time of construction in 1952, was the longest continuous over-water steel structure. A second parallel span was added in 1973 and a third has been discussed, most recently in 2006. A third span would not open, according to state officials, until about 2025. The bridges have eased commuting to larger cities. Kent Island, site of the first English settlement on the Shore, has become a bedroom community for Washington, DC; Annapolis, and Baltimore. Kent Island is part of Queen Anne's County.
U.S. Route 13
Maryland Route 213

The two major highways on the Eastern Shore are U.S. Route 13 and U.S. Route 50, which meet in Salisbury.

Airports
Salisbury-Ocean City Wicomico Regional Airport, in Salisbury, is the only commercial airport on the Delmarva Peninsula.

Airports for private aircraft include:
Bay Bridge Airport in Stevensville
Cambridge-Dorchester Airport in Cambridge
Crisfield Municipal Airport in Crisfield.
Easton Airport, in Easton
Ocean City Municipal Airport in Ocean City

Secession
The Eastern Shore has made several attempts to separate from Maryland. Proposals were debated in Maryland's General Assembly in 1833–1835, 1852, and 1998. There were earlier proposals visualizing a state encompassing the Delmarva Peninsula. The 1998 proposal by state Senators Richard F. Colburn and J. Lowell Stoltzfus did not specify a status for Eastern Shore's nine counties following secession, but suggested the new state's name could be "Delmarva".

Sports

The Delmarva Shorebirds are a minor league baseball team who play Class A baseball in the South Atlantic League at Arthur W. Perdue Stadium in Salisbury, affiliated with the Baltimore Orioles.

Culture
Salisbury hosts the largest bicycling event east of the Mississippi – the Sea Gull Century and two major Maryland wine and craft beer festivals.

Easton hosts a three-day artist event, the Waterfowl Festival, every November.
Duck and goose hunting from blinds is a popular activity using carved wooden duck decoys, which can also be prized works of art.

Media references

In 2005, the film Wedding Crashers was filmed on locations at Maryland's Eastern Shore, including the historic Inn at Perry Cabin.

In 1978, Chesapeake, a novel by James A. Michener and published by Random House, deals with several families living in the Chesapeake Bay area, from 1583 to 1978.

Notable people

John Andrews, clergyman. Born in Cecil County.
Frank "Home Run" Baker, baseball player
John Barth, fiction writer. Born in Cambridge, Dorchester County.
Erin Burnett, News Anchor. Born in Mardela Springs, Wicomico County.
Gilbert Byron, "Poet of the Chesapeake"
William Claiborne, first English settler within Maryland. Settled in Kent County.
Frederick Douglass, abolitionist. Born in Talbot County.
Jimmie Foxx, baseball player. Born in Sudlersville, Maryland in Northern Queen Anne's County.
Robert Goldsborough, delegate to the Continental Congress
Lambert Wickes, Revolutionary War naval hero.
Linda Hamilton, actress. Born in Salisbury, Wicomico County.
Edward Lloyd, delegate to the Continental Congress. Born in Talbot County.
Dale Midkiff, actor. Born in Chance Somerset County.
John Needles, Quaker abolitionist and a master craftsman of fine furniture
Bill Nicholson, baseball player
Frank Perdue, entrepreneur. Born in Salisbury, Wicomico County. Former CEO of Perdue Farms.
Earl S. Richardson, 11th President of Morgan State University. Born in Westover, Maryland in Somerset County. 
Maggie Rogers, singer. From Easton, Maryland
J. Millard Tawes, 54th Governor of Maryland. Born in Crisfield, Somerset County.
Matthew Tilghman, delegate to the Continental Congress
Tench Tilghman, aide-de-camp to George Washington
Harriet Tubman, abolitionist, political activist, and Underground Railroad conductor
Harold Baines, baseball player. Born in Talbot County.
Paul Sarbanes, former US Senator. Born in Salisbury, Wicomico County

Towns and cities
County seats:
 Denton – Caroline County
 Elkton – Cecil County
 Cambridge – Dorchester County
 Chestertown – Kent County
 Centreville – Queen Anne's County
 Princess Anne – Somerset County
 Easton – Talbot County
 Salisbury – Wicomico County
 Snow Hill – Worcester County

See also
 Battle of Kedges Strait - the last naval engagement of the American Revolution

References

External links

 
Proposed states and territories of the United States
Regions of Maryland